Schafflund (Danish: Skovlund, North Frisian: Schaflün) is a municipality in the district of Schleswig-Flensburg, in Schleswig-Holstein, Germany. It is situated approximately 16 km west of Flensburg.

Schafflund is the seat of the Amt ("collective municipality") Schafflund.

References

Schleswig-Flensburg